Indian Sports Honours are awards given annually by the RPSG Group in association with the Virat Kohli Foundation to outstanding sports personalities from India. The awards were founded in 2017.

2017 Awards 
The inaugural 2017 award ceremony was held on 11 November 2017 in Mumbai. The jury was chaired by former all-England champion and chief national badminton coach Pullela Gopichand, and comprises multiple Grand Slam winner Mahesh Bhupathi, sprinter PT Usha, former world number one shooter Anjali Bhagwat and former India hockey captain Arjun Halappa. The awards were given in different categories.

References

Indian sports trophies and awards
Annual events in India
Recurring events established in 2017
RPG Group